Văleni is a village in southwestern Cahul District, Moldova, about  to the north of Galați.

Notable people
 Gheorghe Vodă (1934 in Văleni – 2007 in Chişinău) was a writer from Moldova.
 Lidia - known also as Boonika (meaning grandma) - she became famous in the Eurovision Song Contest of 2005 by banging the drum on the Moldovan entry, which took sixth place! "Boonika Bate Doba" ("Grandmamma Beats the Drum-a") was performed in English and Romanian by Zdob și Zdub

References

Villages of Cahul District
Populated places on the Prut